Daylight Ghosts is an album by Craig Taborn, with Chris Speed (tenor saxophone, clarinet), Chris Lightcap (double bass, bass guitar), and Dave King (drums, percussion). It was released by ECM Records in 2017.

Background
Taborn's previous releases as leader for ECM Records were the solo piano Avenging Angel from 2011 and the trio recording Chants, released two years later. For Daylight Ghosts, Taborn wanted to record something "simple and clear".

Recording and music
All of the compositions are by Taborn, except for "Jamaican Farewell", a 3/4 waltz by Roscoe Mitchell. "'The Shining One' mixes quick, boppish exchanges of motifs with twisting, written-unison lines. 'New Glory' is exhilarating free-jazz with a Chick Corea-like Latin vamp in it, and there are deep clarinet and bass interludes, brief bursts of rock-piano riffing and subtle minglings of electronic loops and long-tone sax sounds on 'Phantom Ratio'." On "Ancient", "the quartet snakes around a bass vamp in C, in a series of contrapuntal variations, before (in Taborn's words) 'falling together', as if the four instruments had fused into one". Taborn also used a Farfisa organ and synthesizers (including Prophet 6) on the album.

Release
Daylight Ghosts was released on February 3, 2017, by ECM.

Reception
Critic John Fordham wrote that, "Only players with deep jazz insights and wide musical references could have made this fine album." Writing for JazzTimes, Colin Fleming stated, "the challenge in making a hybrid acoustic/electronic album sound like a genuine blend rests in large part with ensemble play, from which solos emerge—tendrils as extensions of the whole. This four-piece unit, led by Craig Taborn on piano and various electronic accouterments [...] proves itself befitting of the specters of the title, moving in diaphanous forms with haunting presence." RTÉ.ie's Paddy Kehoe stated, "At times you sense here solid, cerebral cubes of sound being made to melt in the heat of performance, yet it’s not as simple as that, as Taborn and company do so much more. Recommended." Michael Toland of Blurt commented, "A remarkable work that takes his artistry to the next level, Daylight Ghosts puts Taborn in the league of the jazz greats." Cormac Larkin of The Irish Times added, "Eclectic and episodic, like a vaguely unsettling art movie, Daylight Ghosts glows with the heat of invention, but it’s couched in language that Taborn’s predecessors would have understood."

Track listing
ECM – ECM 2527

Source:

Personnel
Craig Taborn – piano, electronics
Chris Speed – tenor saxophone, clarinet
Chris Lightcap – double bass, bass guitar
Dave King – drums, percussion

Charts

References 

Albums produced by Manfred Eicher
Craig Taborn albums
ECM Records albums